The Mukhaizna Oil Field is an oilfield in Al Wusta Governorate, Oman.

It is served by Mukhaizna Airport.

References 
  Oxy - Our Business - Oil and Gas - Middle East Region - Oman
  Sultanate of Oman Mukhaizna Oil Field
 A Barell Full - Mukhaizna Oil Field
  OOCEP - Mukhaizna
  Oman Oil Company - Oil Exploration and Production in Mukhaizna Concession

Oil fields of Oman